Volto! (often stylized VOLTO!) is an American rock jam band based in Los Angeles, California, United States. First formed in the early 2000s, the current band roster consists of Lance Morrison on bass, Danny Carey  (Tool) on drums, Matt Rohde on keyboards, and John Ziegler on guitars. Carey and Ziegler played together in Pigmy Love Circus and in jam sessions at a jazz club in Southern California's San Fernando Valley with Morrison. Though the three musicians often played jazz fusion during the sessions, their music evolved to a sound more like progressive rock, as evidenced on their debut release Incitare.

Discography

Albums
 Incitare (2013)

Music videos
"Tocino" (2013)

Personnel
 Danny Carey – drums
 Lance Morrison – bass
 Matt Rohde – keyboards
 John Ziegler – guitars

References

External links
 

American jazz ensembles from California
American instrumental musical groups
Fantasy Records artists
Jam bands
Jazz fusion ensembles
Musical groups from Los Angeles
American musical trios
Progressive rock musical groups from California
Jazz musicians from California